Janus Metz Pedersen (born 1974) is a Danish film director and documentary filmmaker.

Work
Metz worked as a documentary researcher and moved to South Africa. There he worked on the television drama Soul City before making his debut documentary short Township Boys in 2006. His feature documentaries include Love on Delivery and Ticket to Paradise. These two films are a two-part series depicting women in a situation of mail-ordered brides from Vietnam and Thailand to Denmark.

In 2010, Pedersen directed Armadillo.

In 2015, Pedersen directed the third episode, "Maybe Tomorrow", of the second season of True Detective, starring Colin Farrell, Rachel McAdams and Vince Vaughn.

Metz directed the 2017 film Borg/McEnroe.

After this Metz returned to the documentaries by making 'Heartbound: A Different Kind of Love Story' (2018) about more than 900 Thai women married to men in a small region of Denmark.

He directed three episodes of ZeroZeroZero, which premiered on Sky Atlantic, Italy, in February 2020.

He was the director of the Amazon production All the Old Knives, released in 2022, an American spy thriller written by Olen Steinhauer.

Awards
 Winner at BFI London Film Festival, Cannes Film Festival, Critics' Choice Movie Award and Shaken's Stars.
 Official selection of Brisbane International Film Festival, Cleveland International Film Festival and Toronto International Film Festival.

References

Works Cited
Lars Skree
Armadillo (2010)

External links
 

1974 births
Living people
Danish film directors
Danish television directors
Roskilde University alumni